French is spoken by a significant minority in Laos. Laos has the second largest Francophone community in Southeast Asia after Vietnam, with Cambodia coming in third. French is used as a diplomatic and commercial language and is also studied by over a third of students in Laos. Consequently, French enjoys a healthier status in Laos than in Vietnam and Cambodia, although it is still under threat from the encroaching use of English.

History
The French language was introduced to Laos in the 19th century when French explorers arrived in Laos trying to make inroads into China after colonizing Vietnam. The French did not pay much attention to the kingdom of Lan Xang but established a consulate in present-day Luang Prabang.  The actual catalysts for the establishment of colonial protectorate over Lao cultural regions were French fears of economic and political competition from Britain.   By the 1890s, border disputes with Siam and France led to the Franco-Siamese War and the borders of Laos and Siam were established in favor of France and Laos became a French protectorate. Unlike in Vietnam, the French did not pursue to fully exert their influence in Laos and it was not until the 1900s that French began to be introduced into schools in Laos, but it was mostly limited to Vientiane. However, French rule finally gained firmer ground and French soon became the primary language of government and education and the language spread into southern Laos following the founding of Pakse. The French language peaked between the 1910s and World War II and spread throughout the nation but, like Vietnam, was not widely spoken in most rural areas. French eventually became the language of government officials and the elite. When Japan invaded Laos in World War II, French remained in the educational system, unlike in Vietnam, where Vietnamese became the sole language of education, but the Lao language was briefly used in the government. French returned as the sole political language after France resumed its rule of Laos and was co-official with Lao when Laos was granted self-rule in 1949, but Lao became the sole official language after independence in 1953.

The French language's decline was slower and occurred later than in Vietnam and Cambodia in Laos as the monarchy of Laos had close political relations with France. At the eve of the Vietnam War, the Secret War was beginning in Laos as political factions between communist Pathet Lao and the government occurred. Pathet Lao held areas used Lao as their sole language and following the end of the Vietnam War, French began its sharp decline in Laos. Additionally, many elite and French-educated Lao immigrated to nations such as the United States and France to escape government persecution. With the end of isolationism in the early 1990s however, the French language rebounded, thanks to the establishment of French, Swiss and Canadian relations and opening of French-language centers in central Laos. Today, French has a healthier status in Laos than the other Francophone nations of Asia and about 35% of all students in Laos receive their education in French, with the language being a required course in many schools. French is also used in public works in central and southern Laos and Luang Prabang and is a language of diplomacy and of the elite classes, higher professions and elders. However, the English language has continued to threaten the French language in Laos as it is seen as the language of international commerce and some schools have also made English a mandatory subject. Laos is also a member of La Francophonie.

Characteristics

The French spoken in Laos is based on standard Parisian French but has some minor differences in vocabulary as in other French dialects of Asia. Mixtures of Lao are sometimes added into French, giving it a local flavor. Some Lao words that have found their way into the French language are used in Laos as well. There are some notable differences between Lao and standard French such as:

 The incorporation of Lao words into French when referring to native Lao topics such as food, plants, etc.

See also

 French language in Vietnam
 French language in Cambodia
 French Laos

References

External links
 Official website of La Francophonie

Laos
Languages of Laos
French dialects